Rebecca Elizabeth Want (born 13 June 1964, Hyde, Cheshire) is a radio and television broadcaster, based in Manchester.

Radio career
Want has worked for the Manchester radio stations Piccadilly Radio and Key 103, where she co-presented the launch show with Tim Grundy in September 1988.

She has been a presenter for BBC Radio Manchester for over 5 years hosting the station's weekday afternoon show.

TV career
Want was a features presenter on the North West regional news magazine programme Granada Tonight in the early 1990s on Manchester based ITV station Granada Television. Want has also been a face on 'What's New' alongside Tony Wilson, 'Traveller's Check' with Stuart Hall (presenter), 'Livetime', 'Psychic Livetime' and 'Predictions' for satellite station Granada Breeze. She has worked for ITV's 'Livetalk' and 'Which Way'. On the BBC she has presented Inside Out North West for BBC North West and features on Channel M's 'Moving Manchester'. She also starred in a Beryl Bainbridge production on BBC One

Charity work
She is an ambassador for the Prince's Trust She ran the London Marathon in 2010 for Manchester's Christie Hospital and in 2011 she ran the Great Manchester Run for the same charity. She took part in Comic Relief 2011 and was challenged to perform as a stand-up comedian at the 'Frog and Bucket' comedy club in Manchester. She is listed as a key supporter of the Moore Foundation.

Personal life
Born in Hyde, she studied drama at university. Her career began as a secretary at a radio station where she was given the opportunity to go on air. She has a son, Isaac.

References

External links 
Interview with Becky Want

1964 births
Living people
People from Stockport
English radio DJs
English television presenters